Srijanshil Arajakta is a literary movement in Nepal described by the Kathmandu Post as "urg[ing] the inclusion of ethnic identities within mainstream Nepali literature." Novelist Rajan Mukarung and poets Upendra Subba and Hangyug Agyat started the movement in 1997.

Principles 
The principles of Srijanshil Arajakta are as follows;

 Plurality in thoughts
 Multicultural writings
 Ethnic consciousness
 Poetic freedom
 Creative decision

See also 

 Ralpha
 Tesro Aayam

References

Nepalese literary movements
Nepalese literature